Honoured Doctor of the People was the highest honorary title awarded to physicians in East Germany. It was given in form of a medal. The title was stablished on 31 March 1949 and awarded every year on 11 December, the birthday of Robert Koch.

Sources 
 Bundesministerium für innerdeutsche Beziehungen (Hrsg.): DDR-Handbuch, Auszeichnungen, Verlag Wissenschaft und Politik, 1985, S. 26 und 29, .
 Andreas Herbst, Winfried Ranke, Jürgen R. Winkler: So funktionierte die DDR, Lexikon der Organisationen und Institutionen; Gesundheitswesen, Rowohlt Taschenbuch, 1994, .

Honorary titles
Medicine awards
Awards established in 1949
1949 establishments in East Germany
Orders, decorations, and medals of East Germany